CYP4F22 (cytochrome P450, family 4, subfamily F, polypeptide 22) is a protein that in humans is encoded by the CYP4F22 gene.

This gene encodes a member of the cytochrome P450 superfamily of enzymes. The cytochrome P450 proteins are monooxygenases which catalyze many reactions involved in drug metabolism and synthesis of cholesterol, steroids and other lipids. This gene is part of a cluster of cytochrome P450 genes on chromosome 19 and encodes an enzyme thought to play a role in the 12(R)-lipoxygenase pathway. Mutations in this gene are the cause of ichthyosis lamellar type 3.

Activity
CYP4F22, like other CYP4F proteins, is a Cytochrome P450 omega hydroxylase, i.e. an enzyme that metabolizes fatty acids to their omega hydroxyl derivatives (see Omega oxidation).  This hydroxylation may: a) produce a biologically important signaling molecule such as occurs in the metabolism of 20-carbon straight chain polyunsaturated fatty acid, arachidonic acid, to 20-Hydroxyeicosatetraenoic acid, b) inactivate a biologically important product such as the metabolism of the arachidonic acid metabolite, 5-oxo-eicosatetraenoic acid, to its ~100-fold less potent product, 5-oxo-20-hydroxy-eicosatetraenoic acid, or c) be the first step in the further metabolism of xenobiotics or natural compounds CYP4F22 serves the latter function.  It is a type 1 Integral membrane protein located in the endoplasmic reticulum of cells in the stratum granulosum of mammalian, including human, skin where it functions to attach an omega hydroxyl residue to fatty acids that are exceptionally long, 28 or more carbons, i.e. the very long chain fatty acids (VLCFA).  These VLCFA targets need not be free fatty acids but also can be acylated in an amide bond to sphingosine to form an acylceramide.

Function
CYP4F22 omega hydroxylates the VLCFA in esterified omega-oxyacyl-sphingosine complex to form an esterified omega-hydroxyacyl-sphingosine complex. This step is critical for delivering the wax-like, extremely hydrophobic VLCFA to the stratum corneum near the skin surface. It is these skin surface VLCFA which create and maintain the skin's ability to function as a water barrier.

CYP4F22, like many of the CYP4F series of CYPs, may prove to serve other functions but its role in hydroxylating VLCFA in the skin's water barrier function, as defined in genetic studies (see below), has dominated research on it.

Genetic studies
A small number of newborns with Congenital ichthyosiform erythroderma have been found to have autosomal recessive lose of function mutations in CYP4F22. Of the varies subtypes of congenital ichthyosiform erythroderma, these mutations have been associated almost exclusively with the Lamellar ichthyosis subtype.

References

Further reading